Rollcage Stage II is a racing video game developed by Attention to Detail for PlayStation and Microsoft Windows. It is the sequel to Rollcage. On top of the basic racing concept, the cars can be equipped with weapons, which are picked up on the track as bonuses, which can be used against competing cars. The automobiles themselves, once again, have wheels that are larger than the body of the car thus creating a car that has no up or down and therefore can be flipped yet continue to drive.

For the North American Windows release, game publisher Take-Two Interactive repackaged the original European/Australasian version as Death Track Racing.

Rollcage Stage II was also among the first titles to feature hardware-accelerated bump mapping upon its release in March 2000, in the form of EMBM (Environment Mapped Bump Mapping). RSII was designed to be best experienced at the time on Matrox Millennium G400 graphics cards, released in mid-1999, which had exclusive support for EMBM until the ATI Radeon was released in late 2000. Matrox's bump mapping technology was much hyped by industry press outlets at the time, with Matrox demoing Rollcage Stage II as a cutting-edge showcase for their cards, as well as dedicating a page on their website to the game.

Reception

Rollcage Stage II received "favourable" reviews, while Death Track Racing received "average" reviews, according to the review aggregation website Metacritic. Daniel Erickson of NextGen said of the former's European version, just over six months before its U.S. release date, "A wonderful surprise, Rollcage Stage II is everything Wipeout 3 should've been but wasn't." Electronic Gaming Monthly, Official U.S. PlayStation Magazine, and Game Informer also gave the same European version average to positive reviews, also over six months before its U.S. release date.

Notes

Spiritual successors
While Attention To Detail (ATD) and Psygnosis did not continue on the Rollcage series after Rollcage Stage II, ATD later developed the game Firebugs featuring roughly the same racing concept.

After the end of support by the developers and publishers, a former ATD developer who previously worked on the Rollcage games, Robert Baker, released in 2014 updated builds of the games' Windows versions. These builds, based on the original source code, fix longstanding bugs and update both games for use on modern operating systems: Rollcage Redux for Rollcage and Rollcage Extreme for Rollcage Stage II

In 2015, Robert Baker approached former ATD and Rollcage teammate David Perryman to form Caged Element under the impulsion of entrepreneur Chris Mallinson. Caged Element launched a Kickstarter campaign for Grip, a spiritual successor for the Rollcage series. A prototype was completed before the Kickstarter crowdfunding campaign using Unreal Engine 4. The development staff has two people who worked on the Rollcage series and the soundtrack has artists Technical Itch and Dom & Roland who were on the soundtrack for Rollcage Stage II. Grip: Combat Racing was released in November 2018 for Microsoft Windows, PlayStation 4, Xbox One and Nintendo Switch.

References

External links
 

2000 video games
Attention to Detail games
Science fiction racing games
Midway video games
PlayStation (console) games
Psygnosis games
Video game sequels
Windows games
Video games developed in the United Kingdom
Multiplayer and single-player video games